Ronald Michiel de Wolf (born 1973) is a Dutch Computer Scientist, currently a Senior Researcher at Centrum Wiskunde & Informatica (CWI) and a professor at the Institute for Logic, Language and Computation (ILLC) of the University of Amsterdam (UvA).

His research interests are on Quantum computing, Quantum information, Coding theory, and Computational complexity theory.

His scientific contributions include the first exponential separation between one-way quantum and classical communication protocols for a partial Boolean function, and a proof that a locally decodable code (LDC) with 2 classical queries need exponential length. This suggested the use of techniques from quantum computing to prove results in "classical" computer science.

De Wolf and his coauthors received the Best Paper Award at the Annual ACM Symposium on Theory of Computing (STOC) in 2012.

Publications 

 
 List of publications on arXiv

References 

1973 births
Living people
Dutch computer scientists
Erasmus University Rotterdam alumni
People from Zaanstad
University of Amsterdam alumni
Academic staff of the University of Amsterdam